The Sydney Comedy Festival is an annual comedy festival held in Sydney.

Launched in 2005 as The Cracker Sydney Comedy Festival at a number of inner city venues, the Festival has grown quickly and now attracts 111,000 patrons every year at venues all across Sydney. The Sydney Comedy Awards were introduced in 2008, to celebrate excellence in the Sydney Comedy Festival.

In 2013, the festival introduced The Sydney Comedy Festival showcase tour, bringing bits of the festival to towns all over Australia.

2020 saw the festival go on hiatus. In 2021, it was held 19 April to 16 May.

Venues have included State Theatre, Enmore Theatre, The Concourse, and Riverside Theatres. Performers have included Ronny Chieng, Matt Okine, Rhys Nicholson, and Corey White.

Special events
The Sydney Comedy Festival produces the following current special events:
 Cracker Night
 Sydney Comedy Festival International Showcase
 Sydney Comedy Festival Gala
 Sydney Comedy Festival Secret Show

Special events in past years include:
 The Mother of All Galas
 The Great Comedy Debate
 Chopper's ANZAC Day Show

Festivals by year

2020
No festival was held upon cancellation.

2014
The 2014 Festival was held from 22 April to 17 May.

Awards
Awards were presented at the closing party of the festival as follows:

 Best of the Fest [International] winner: David O'Doherty
 Best of the Fest [Local] winner: Ronny Chieng
 Best newcomer award winner: Luke McGregor
 The Director's choice award: Sam Simmons

2013
The 2013 Festival was held from 22 April – 11 May

Awards
Awards were presented at the closing party of the festival as follows:

 Best of the Fest [International] winner: Paul Foot
 Best of the Fest [Local] winner: Matt Okine
 Best newcomer award winner: Steen Raskopoulos
 The breakout artist award winner: Trevor Noah
 The Director's choice award: Michael Workman
 The MX Joke of the Festival: Rhys Nicholson

2012
The 2012 Festival was held from 24 April to 12 May.

Awards
Awards were presented on the final day of the festival as follows:

 Sydney Comedy Festival Best Newcomer – Rhys Nicholson- chosen by a panel of industry professionals 
 Best International – Daniel Kitson- Time Out, people choice
 Best Local – Felicity Ward – Time Out, people choice
 Best Sydney – Luke Heggie – Time Out, peoples choice
 Best Sydney Comedy Night – Happy Endings, El Roco Room
 Time Out Critics Choice – Lou Sanz

2011
In 2011, the festival held events at the Enmore Theatre, Sydney Opera House, The State Theatre, The Metro, The Factory Theatre, the Seymour Centre, Parade Theatres, The Hayden Orpheum, Riverside Theatre and many more between 11 April and 8 May.

Awards
 Best International Act – Danny Bhoy
 Best Local Act – Felicity Ward
 People's Choice Award – Dead Cat Bounce

2010

Awards
 Best of Fest – Glenn Wool
 Best Local Act – Axis of Awesome
 Best International Act – Pajama Men
 The Jury Prize – Dead Cat Bounce
 Best Newcomer – Cloud Girls
 People's Choice Award – Tommy Bradson

2009

Awards
 Best Newcomer – The Pajama Men
 Best Local Act – Julia Morris
 Best International Act – Jeremy Hotz
 The Jury Prize – The Paradoxical Adventures of Lawrence Leung and Andrew McClelland
 People's Choice Award – The Al Pitcher Picture Show
 Best of the Fest Award – The Pajama Men

2008

Awards
 Best Newcomer – DeAnne Smith
 Best Local Act- Lawrence Leung
 Best International Act- Mark Watson
 People's Choice Award – Ross Noble
 Best of the Fest Award – Mark Watson
 Director's Choice Award – Amelia Jane Hunter

Showcase Tour
The inaugural Sydney Comedy Festival Showcase brought the laughs to all corners of regional NSW and QLD leaving an audience of over 10 000 in stitches.
Touring over 11 weeks (July – September 2013) with 33 shows, the show visited the following towns and cities:

 Canberra 
 Queanbeyan
 Cooma
 Bundaberg
 Noosa
 Brisbane
 Toowoomba
 Capella
 Proserpine
 Rockhampton
 Mackay
 Dee Why
 Narooma
 Batemans Bay
 Merimbula
 Gosford
 Newcastle
 Cessnock
 Sutherland
 Bathurst
 Dubbo
 Katoomba
 Nowra
 Wollongong
 Coffs Harbour
 Ballina
 Lismore
 Tamworth
 Port Macquarie
 Taree
 Wodonga
 Wagga
 Griffith

Comics
Comedians who have appeared at The Sydney Comedy Festival include:

 Aamer Rahman & Nazeem Hussain (Fear of a Brown Planet) (2008, 2010, 2011)
 Adam Hills (2006, 2009)
 Adrian Edmondson & The Bad Shepherds (2013)
 Ahmad Ahmed	(2006)
 Akmal Saleh (2005, 2006, 2008, 2010)
 Alex Lee (2013)
 Alex Lykos (A Long Night) (2013)
 Alex Williamson (2013)
 Alice Fraser (aggressively Helpful) (2013)
 Al Lubel (2005)
 Al Pitcher (2008, 2009, 2010)
 Alexis Dubis (2010)
 Alonzo Bodden (2010)
 Amanda Buckley & Susie Youseff (2013)
 Amelia Jane Hunter (2008, 2010, 2011, 2013)
 Andres Lopez (2011)
  Andrew Hastings (2016)
 Andrew Dice Clay (2006)
 Andrew McClelland (2008, 2009, 2011)
 Andrew Stanley (2008, 2009)
 Angelo Tsarouchas (2008)
 Anh Do (2008, 2013)
 Anil Desai (2011)
 Anthony Salame (2008, 2009, 2010, 2011, 2013)
 Ardal O'Hanlon (2011)
 Arj Barker (2006, 2008, 2013)
 Austen Tayshus (2005)
 Axis of Awesome (2008, 2009, 2010, 2013)
 Bard to the Bone (2013)
 Barry Diamond (2005)
 Bart Freebairn (2013)
 Basile (2005, 2010)
 Bear Pack vs Cubs (2013)
 Benjamin Crellin (2010)
 Ben Darsow (2013)
 Ben Ellwood (2013)
 Best Newcomers Show (2013)
 Black Rose (2005)
 The Breakfast Club (2013)
 Bo Burnham (2011)
 Bob Downe (2005)
 Brad Garrett (2005)
 Brendhan Lovegrove (2006, 2008)
 Brendon Burns (2009)
 Brett Nichols (2008)
 Bruce Griffiths (2005)
 Busting Out (2008)
 Cam Knight (2013)
 Cameron James (2013)
 Carl Barron (2006)
 Carl-Einar Hackner (2010, 2011)
 Carpe Idiotus (2011)
 Celia Pacquola (2010)
 Charlie Pickering (2005, 2006)
 Cheech & Chong (2009)
 Chris Radburn (2008, 2009, 2011)
 Chris Wainhouse (Homeless Brad) (2011)
 Circus Bizarre (2005)
 Connie Chang (2006)
 Craig Hill (2010, 2011, 2013)
 Custard Club (2015)
 Cyrus Bezyan (2013)
 Damien Power (2013)
 Dane Hiser (2013)
 Daniel Kiston (2013)
 Daniel Moore (2010, 2011)
 Daniel Sloss (2010, 2011, 2013)
 Daniel Townes (2008, 2009, 2010, 2011, 2013)
 Danny Bhoy (2005, 2006, 2009, 2011, 2013)
 Danny McGinlay (2013)
 Dave Bloustien (2006, 2007, 2009, 2010)
 Dave Eastgate (2010, 2011, 2013)
 Dave Jory (2008, 2009)
 Dave Keeshan & Andrew Barnett (2013)
 Dave Thornton (2010, 2013)
 David O'Doherty (2008, 2009, 2010, 2013)
 David Williams (2013)
 David Quirk (2013)
 Dayne Rathbone (2013)
 Dead Cat Bounce (2010, 2011)
 DeAnne Smith (2008, 2009, 2010, 2011)
 Dennis Crocker (2013)
 Des Bishop (2009, 2010)
 Diane Spencer (2010)
 Die Roten Punkte (2010)
 Dom Irrera (2010)
 Doug Stanhope (2005)
 Dylan Moran (2009)
 Eddie Brill (2006)
 Eddie Ifft (2009, 2010, 2013)
 Eddie Perfect (2006)
 Effie (2013)
 Elliot Goblet (2006)
  El Jaguar (2013)
 End of Holidays Kids Disco (2013)
 Eric Hutton (2011)
 Ethnic Comedy Allstars (2013)
 Evin Donohoe (2011, 2013)
 Fairy Fail (2010)
 Felicity Ward (2009, 2011)
 Fiona O'Loughlin (2008, 2009, 2010)
 Full Body Contact No Love Tennis (2013)
 Frank Woodley (2012)
 Gabriel Iglesias (2011)
 Gabriel Rossi (2005, 2006)
 Garry Who (2005) 
 George Kapiniaris (2008, 2009)
 George Lopez (2006, 2009)
 Genevieve Fricker (2013)
 Gina Yashere (2010, 2011, 2013)
 Glenn Wool (2010, 2011)
 The Golden Goose Awards (2013)
 Gordon Southern (2013)
 Greg Burns (2006) 
 Greg Davies (2011)
 Greg Fleet (2013)
 Greg Proops (2010)
 Greta Lee Jackson (2013)
 Griffiths & Dean (2006)
 Guy Pratt (2011)
 Hannah Gadsby (2008, 2009, 2010)
 Heath Franklin (2008, 2009, 2010, 2011, 2013)
 Henry Rollins (2010)
 Hing & Magee (2010, 2011)
 Hung Le (2011)
 Hypnolarious (2011)
 Idiots of Ants (2013
 Il Davo (2009)
 Imaan Hadchiti (2013)
 Jack Dee (2013)
 Jackie Loeb (2005, 2006, 2008, 2009, 2010)
 Jack Whitehall (2008, 2009, 2011)
 Jacques Barrett (2013)
 James Colley (2013)
 James Walmsley (2013)
 Jamie Kennedy (2008)
 Jamie Kilstein (2009)
 Jarred Christmas (2010, 2013)
 Jason Alexander (2008)
 Jason Byrne (2010, 2011)
 Jeff Green (2011)
 Jeremy Hotz	(2009, 2010)
 Jewish Comedy Showcase (2013)
 Jim Jeffries (2005, 2013)
 Jimeoin (2006, 2008)
 Joe Avati (2006)
 Joe Dolce (2005)
 Joel Creasey (2011, 2013)
 John Robertson (2011)
 Jono Lee (2013)
 Jon Bennett (Pretending Things Are a Cock) (2013)
 Jordan Raskopoulos (2007)
 Josh Thomas (2008, 2009)
 Josh Earle (2013)
 Josie Long (2013)
 Julia Morris (2005, 2006, 2008, 2009)
 Julia Wilson (2008, 2011)
 Julian Clary (2010)
 Justin Hamilton	(2008, 2009, 2010)
 Karl Chandler (2013)
 Kelfi & Fikel (2013)
 Kent Valentine (2008)
 Kitty Flanagan (2010)
 Lady Sings It Better (2013)
 Laura Hughes (2013)
 Lawrence Leung (2008, 2009, 2011, 2013)
 Lenny Bruce (2013)
 Little Dum Dum Club Podcast (2013)
 Lou Sanz (2011)
 Luke Heggie (2013)
 Luke & Wyatt (2010)
 Marc Maron (2008)
 Marcel Lucont (2011)
 Margaret Cho (2013)
 Mark Watson (2008, 2009, 2011)
 Mark Williamson (2010, 2012, 2013)
 Mat Wakefield (2013)
 Matt Dyktynski (2005, 2013)
 Matt Okine (2011, 2013)
 Matty Grey (2013)
 Mel Buttle (2013)
 Michael Chamberlin (2010)
 Michael Hing (2013) 
 Michael Workman (2010, 2011, 2013, 2015)
 Michelle Lim (2013)
 Mick Meredith (2006, 2013)
 Mickey D (2013)
 Mikey Mileos (2011)
 Milton Jones (2009)
 Mitch Fatel (2010)
 MotherFather (2013)
 Mr Snot Bottom (2013)
 Nath Valvo (2013)
 Nick Capper (2013)
 Nick Cody (2013)
 Nick Fischer (2013)
 Nick Sun (2009, 2010, 2013)
 Nikki Britton (2013)
 Nina Conti (2011)
 Pablo Francisco (2009, 2010)
 Paco Erhard (2013)
 Paige Hally (2016)
 Paul Foot (2013)
 Paul McDermott (2013)
 Pauly Shore (2010)
 Pedigree Syndicate (2011)
 Peter Berner (2010, 2011)
 Polytoxic (2009)
 Possum Magic (2013)
 Puppetry of the Penis (2008)
 Rachel Berger (2006)
 Randy (2013)
 Rain Pryor (2006)
 Raymond Crowe (2008, 2010)
 Rebel Wilson (2005)
 Reggie Watts (2009, 2010, 2011)
 Reginald D Hunter (2008, 2009, 2010)
 Rhys Nicholson (2013)
 Rights! Comedy! Action! (Judith Lucy) (2013
 Robbins, Stilson & Molloy (2010)
 Rob Lloyd (2013)
 RocKwiz Live (2011)
 Ronny Chieng (2011, 2013)
 Ross Noble (2005, 2006, 2008, 2010, 2013)
 Roy Chubby Brown (2006, 2011)
 Russell Kane (2010)
 Ryan Withers (2011)
 Sally Kimpton (2008)
 Sam Cosentino (2005)
 Sam Simmons	(2006)
 Sammy J & Randy (2011)
 Sandra Bernhard (2005)
 Sarah Quinn (2011)
 Scared Weird Little Guys (2006, 2011)
 Scratch (2008, 2009)
 Seamus McAlary (2011)
 Sean Woodland (2013)
 Seaton Kay-Smith (2013)
 Seizure Kaiser (2012,2013,2015,2016)
 Shane Mauss (2010)
 Shane Warne The Musical (2009)
 Simon Palomares (2009)
 Simon Kennedy (2008, 2013, 2015, 2016, 2019)
 Six Quick Chicks (2010)
 Smart Casual (2011, 2013)
 Sons of Singapore (2013)
 Spy Monkey (2006)
 Steele Saunders (2013)
 Steen Raskopoulos (2013)
 Stephen K. Amos (2006, 2011, 2013)
 Steve Coogan (2009)
 Steve Hughes (2008, 2010, 2011,2013)
 Steve Patterson (2008)
 Steve Philps (2008)
 Steven Wright (2005)
 The Stevenson Experience (2013)
 Sugar Sammy	(2008, 2009)
 Superwog & Mychonny (2013
 Tahir (2006, 2008, 2011, 2013, 2015, 2016)
 Tammy Sussman (2013)
 The Bad Boys of Comedy (2010)
 The Bedroom Philosopher (2010)
 The Chaser (2008)
 The Cloud Girls (2009, 2010, 2011)
 The Colors (2009)
 The Dirty Bros (2009)
 The Gigalees (2010, 2011)
 The Kransky Sisters	(2006, 2010, 2013)
 The Pajama Men (2009, 2010, 2013)
 The Umbilical Brothers (2005, 2006, 2009)
 Theatre Sports (2013)
 Tim Minchin	(2009)
 Tien Tran (2013)
 Titty Bar Ha Ha (2013)
 Tom Ballard (2013)
 TomWalker (2013)
 Tom Gleeson (2010)
 Tom Green (2010)
 Tommy Dassalo (2011, 2013)
 Tommy Dean (2010, 2011)
 Tommy Little (2013)
 Tommy Tiernan (2010, 2011)
 Tony Woods (2005, 2006, 2009, 2010)
 Topping & Butch (2006)
 Tripod (2010)
 Tracy Morgan (2013)
 Trevor Noah (2013)
 Two and a Half Lebs (2013)
 Vince Sorrenti (2006)
 The Wayans Brothers (2013)
 Wil Anderson (2010)
 Withers, Capper, Matheson (2010)
 Xavier Michelides (2013)
 Xavier Toby (2013)
 Yo Mama Battle! (2011,2012,2013,2014,2015,2016)
 Zoe Pelbart (2013)

See also
List of festivals in Australia

References

External links
Official Sydney Comedy Festival website

2005 establishments in Australia
Festivals established in 2005
Comedy festivals in Australia
Festivals in Sydney
Sydney Opera House